St. Therese – MTC Colleges is a higher education college in Iloilo City, Philippines which commonly the Maritime School. St. Therese – MTC colleges used to be St. Therese College – La Fiesta and Maritime Training Center (MTC) which merged to become St. Therese – MTC colleges.

Sites

St. Therese – MTC Colleges – La Fiesta Site

Courses Offered:

Bachelor of Science in Hotel and Restaurant Management
Associate in Hotel and Restaurant Management
Bachelor of Science in Hotel, Restaurant and Tourism Management
Associate in Computer Secretarial Course
Bachelor of Science in Computer Science
Associate in Computer Technology
Caregiver Training Program
Bachelor of Science in Interdisplinary Business Studies major in Management
One Year Nursing Aide
Bachelor of Science in Nursing.

St. Therese – MTC Colleges – Magdalo Site

Courses Offered:

Bachelor of Science in Marine Transportation
Bachelor of Science in Marine Engineering
Seafarers Rating Course
Bachelor of Science in Criminology Education
Two Year Cruiseline Services

St. Therese – MTC Colleges –Tigbauan Site

Courses Offered:

Bachelor of Science in Marine Transportation
Bachelor of Science in Marine Engineering
Associate in Computer Secretarial Course
Associate in Hotel and Restaurant Management
Seafarers Rating Course
Bachelor of Science in Criminology Education
Two Year Cruiseline Services
One-Year Nursing Aide

References

External links
St. therese - MTC colleges La Fiesta College official website
http://www.freewebs.com/stmtcc/ St. Therese – MTC Colleges Magdalo Free Webs

Universities and colleges in Iloilo City